Dodman Point (Cornish: Penn Den Varow) near Mevagissey is the highest headland on the south Cornwall coast, measuring . It is also known by its earlier names of the Deadman and Deadman's Point.  It hosts the remains of an Iron Age promontory fort, and at its seaward end is "Parson Martin's Cross"a large granite cross erected in 1896 to encourage those involved in Christian service, and which aids navigation around the headland. Dodman Point is mentioned in the shanty Spanish Ladies.

To its north-east and in its lee is the small anchorage and sand beach of Gorran Haven.

Below the large stone cross, there is a way down to the bottom of the small cliffs and there is some climbing there on the facesmainly bouldering as it is rarely scaled so there are no fixed anchor points.

Gallery

References

Hill forts in Cornwall
Headlands of Cornwall
Military history of Cornwall